Events in the year 2018 in Ukraine.

Incumbents
President: Petro Poroshenko
Prime Minister: Volodymyr Groysman

Events

June
C14 (Ukrainian group) gained international notoriety after reports it was being involved in violent attacks on Romany camps.

November
2018 Kerch Strait incident

December
The Ukrainian Orthodox Church becomes independent.

Deaths

14 January – Lidiia Hryhorchuk, linguist, linguogeographer, dialectologist, paleographer, art critic, professor and a doctor of philology (b. 1926).
18 January – Borys Yukhymovych Steklyar, military officer (b. 1923).
31 January – Leonid Kadeniuk, pilot and astronaut (b. 1951).
10 February – Myroslav Popovych, philosopher (b. 1930)
14 February – Pyotr Bochek, military officer (b. 1925)
5 March – Mykhaylo Chemberzhi, composer (b. 1944).
28 March – Kateryna Boloshkevich, weaver and statesperson (b. 1939).
18 April – Grigory Gamarnik, wrestler (b. 1929).
2 May – Vadim Mulerman, singer (b. 1938)
6 June – Kira Muratova, film director, screenwriter and actress (b. 1934).
19 June – Ivan Drach, poet, screenwriter and politician, member of Verkhovna Rada (b. 1936).
7 July – Levko Lukyanenko, politician (b. 1928).
23 July – Oksana Shachko, artist and human rights activist, co-founder of Femen (b. 1987).
8 August – Mikhail Shakhov, wrestler, Olympic bronze medalist (b. 1931).
1 September – Mykola Shytyuk, historian (b. 1953).
14 October – Valeriy Shmarov, politician, Minister of Defence (b. 1945).
4 November – Kateryna Handziuk, politician (b. 1985).
25 November – Viktor Kanevskyi, footballer (b. 1936).
29 November – Viktor Matviyenko, football player and manager, Olympic bronze medalist (b. 1948).
5 December –
, footballer (b. 1944).
, actor (b. 1925).
, writer (b. 1936).
6 December – 
Ivan Hladush, police officer and politician, Minister of Internal Affairs (b. 1929).
, sambist, USSR champion (b. 1946).

References

 
2010s in Ukraine
Years of the 21st century in Ukraine
Ukraine
Ukraine